The Death Cap  is a 1946 mystery detective novel by the British author Ruthven Todd, written under the pen name of R.T. Campbell. It was one of several novels featuring the botanist and amateur detective Professor John Stubbs.

Synopsis
After a young woman belonging to a Bohemian group of artists is poisoned by the death cap mushroom, the domineering and boorish Stubbs sets out to solve the case despite the objects of Chief Inspector Bishop of Scotland Yard.

References

Bibliography
 Hanson, Gillian Mary. City and Shore: The Function of Setting in the British Mystery. McFarland, 2015.
 Main, Peter. A Fervent Mind: The Life of Ruthven Todd. Lomax Press, 2018.
 Royle, Trevor. The Macmillan Companion to Scottish Literature. Macmillan, 1983.

1946 British novels
British mystery novels
British crime novels
British thriller novels
Novels by Ruthven Todd
Novels set in London
British detective novels